The 2017 Mid-American Conference men's soccer season was the 25th season of men's varsity soccer in the conference.

With their win over SIUE on October 28, the Western Michigan Broncos won their first-ever MAC regular season title. The Broncos went undefeated (5-0-0) during the regular season and did not allow a goal in conference play. Akron defeated Western Michigan, 3-1, to win the MAC tournament.

Changes from 2016 
Buffalo announced the discontinuation of men's soccer and three other sports for financial reasons on April 3, 2017.

The Mid-American Conference (MAC) announced on June 2, 2017 that the Southern Illinois University Edwardsville  Cougars men's soccer and wrestling teams would become affiliate members of the MAC beginning in the 2018 season. On June 8, it was announced that the soccer team would make the move for the 2017 season.

Teams

Season outlook 
The MAC in the national preseason polls:

United Soccer Coaches (formerly NSCAA) – Akron #16

College Soccer News – Akron #18, SIU Edwardsville #21

Top Drawer Soccer – Akron #13

Soccer America – Akron #13

Hero Sports – Akron #20

2017 Preseason MAC Coaches' Poll

Source=

Regular season

Rankings

United Soccer Coaches National 
Source =

United Soccer Coaches Great Lakes Regional 
Source =

NCAA RPI
Source =

MAC Players of the Week

NOTES:
 * = Players were also named to the College Soccer News National Team of the Week for that week.
 * = Players were also named to the TopDrawerSoccer.com National Team of the Week for that week.
 † = Stuart Holthusen was not only named the MAC Player of the Week. On Tuesday, October 31, he was selected as the United Soccer Coaches Division I National Player of the Week.

Postseason

MAC tournament 

The 2017 MAC tournament was played November 10 and 12 on the campus of the regular season champion Western Michigan Broncos. Akron beat Western Michigan in the final 3–1,

1st seed – Western Michigan Broncos (15–2–1; 5–0–0 MAC)

2nd seed – Akron Zips (14–3–1; 4–1–0 MAC)

3rd seed – SIUE Cougars (7–9–1; 2–3–0 MAC)

4th seed – West Virginia Mountaineers (9–5–4; 1–2–2 MAC)

NCAA tournament

2018 MLS SuperDraft

Honors

2017 United Soccer Coaches NCAA Division I Men's All-American teams
Source:

2017 United Soccer Coaches NCAA Division I Men's All-Great Lakes Region teams
Source:

2017 CoSIDA Academic All-America teams
Source:

Second team
Zach Bock, Western Michigan University, Senior, 3.98 GPA, Sales & Business Marketing

Third team
Brandon Bye, Western Michigan University, Senior, 3.74 GPA, Food & Consumer Packaging Goods Marketing

2017 CoSIDA Academic All-District teams
Source: 

Only All-District players are eligible for the Academic All-America ballot.

District 2 (DC, DE, KY, MD, NJ, PA, WV) 
Stephen Banick, West Virginia University, Junior, 3.71 GPA, Mathematics

Ryan Kellogg, West Virginia University, Sophomore, 3.87 GPA. Finance

District 5 (IL, IN, MI, OH) 
Drew Shepherd, Western Michigan University, Senior. 3.32 GPA, Aviation Flight Science

Zach Bock, Western Michigan University, Senior, 3.98 GPA, Sales & Business Marketing

Brandon Bye, Western Michigan University, Senior, 3.74 GPA, Food & Consumer Packaging Goods Marketing

2017 United Soccer Coaches NCAA Division I Men's Scholar All-America teams
Source: 

♦ = Additionally, the United Soccer Coaches named Western Michigan's Brandon Bye as the 1017 NCAA Men's Soccer Division I Scholar Player of the Year.		.

United Soccer Coaches  2017 College Team Academic Award
Source:  

The United Soccer Coaches (formerly the NSCAA) annually recognizes college and high school soccer programs that have excelled in the classroom by posting a team grade point average of 3.0 or higher. Five of the MAC's six teams were honored this year. The schools, their head coaches, and their team GPAs are:

University of Akron, Jared Embick, 3.09
Bowling Green State University, Eric Nichols, 3.13
Northern Illinois University, Ryan Swan, 3.23
West Virginia University, Marlon LeBlanc, 3.28
Western Michigan University, Chad Wiseman, 3.34

2017 MAC awards
Source=

2017 MAC All-Conference First Team

2017 MAC All-Conference Second Team

2017 MAC All-Freshman Team

2017 MAC All-Tournament Team
Source=

2017 Mid-American Conference Men's Soccer Tournament MVP— Stuart Holthusen (Akron)

2017 MAC Men's Soccer Academic All-MAC Team
Source= 
The criteria for the All-MAC honor parallels the CoSIDA (College Sports Information Directors of America) standards for Academic All-America voting. Nominees must be starters or important reserves with at least a 3.20 cumulative grade-point average (on a 4.00 scale).

See also 
 2017 NCAA Division I men's soccer season

References

 
2017 NCAA Division I men's soccer season